Merton Park tram stop is a stop on the Tramlink service in the London Borough of Merton.

It overlaps part of the site of the former Merton Park railway station which was served by passenger trains on the West Croydon to Wimbledon Line until 1997, and by trains via Tooting Junction on the Merton Abbey Branch until 1929. The station building of the original station (about 200 yards south) has been converted to a private house.

Access is provided by footpath from Kingston Road at the site of the old level crossing and signal box. A footpath also comes from the nearby nature preserve at Nursery Road playing fields and another level crossing from a footpath from Dorset Road (B285).

Trams call at the stop every 5 minutes with trams scheduled to arrive at both platforms simultaneously.

Connections

London Buses routes 152; 163; and 164 serve the tram stop.

References

Tramlink stops in the London Borough of Merton
Railway stations in Great Britain opened in 2000